Stuart Barnes (born 22 November 1962 in Grays, Essex) is a former English rugby union footballer, and now rugby commentator for Sky Sports. Barnes played fly-half for Newport RFC, Bristol, Bath; and represented England at international level.

Biography 
Born in Essex, he played schoolboy international rugby for Wales national under-18 rugby union team.

He moved from the U15s to the U19s after one season, and he did not miss a schools international for four years between 1976 & 1980. He captained the team on several occasions.

Barnes studied at St Edmund Hall, Oxford, matriculating in 1981. He won three rugby Blues. He played for Oxford against Cambridge University's Rob Andrew in the Varsity match. He graduated from Oxford with a third-class honours degree in history.

Club career 
While at university, Barnes played club rugby for Newport RFC.

Barnes later played for Bristol Bears, including in the 1984 RFU final against Bath Rugby. After being on the losing side for Bristol in that final, he joined Bath.

He arrived at Bath aged 22: "disaffected with England and, with my volatile character, I could easily have drifted out of the game altogether. At the time the big joke was that I'd had more clubs than Jack Nicklaus – Newport, Bristol and Bath by 22 and people doubted my character, they thought of me as being very fickle and at Bath I found what I wanted – a rugby home.".

He was nicknamed The Bath Barrel.

International career 
Barnes made his England debut against Australia in November 1984. He gained 10 caps for England and played his last international match in 1993 against Ireland.

Barnes played for the Barbarians against Wales in October 1990, converting three tries in the Barbarians victory.

Life after playing 
Barnes' last game was the Bath versus Leicester Pilkington Cup Final on 7 May 1994, which Bath won 21–9. He resigned from his job at the Bristol and West building society shortly afterwards. Barnes became a freelance writer and reporter for the The Daily Telegraph, and wrote his autobiography Smelling of Roses.

He later became involved in broadcasting, first with the BBC, and then joined Sky Sports in 1994.

References

External links 
 Statistics at Scrum.com
 1994 Interview post his retirement
 Lions profile

1962 births
Living people
Alumni of St Edmund Hall, Oxford
Barbarian F.C. players
Bath Rugby players
Bristol Bears players
British & Irish Lions rugby union players from England
England international rugby union players
English rugby union commentators
English rugby union players
Gloucestershire County RFU players
Newport RFC players
Oxford University RFC players
People educated at Bassaleg School
People from Grays, Essex
Rugby union fly-halves
Rugby union players from Essex